Wink (윙크) is a popular South Korean manhwa magazine published by Seoul Media Group (Hangul: Seoul Munhwasa, 서울문화사). The first issue was released on 1 August 1993. It publishes Bride of the Water God, Goong  and Hissing.

In July 2012, the magazine moved to digital format and the ongoing series in the magazine are available monthly through online subscription.

Serializations
The following is a list of titles serialized in Wink and/or published under the Wink Comics book imprint.  Some series are updated infrequently and as such do not appear in every issue of the magazine.

See also
Issue (magazine)

References

External links
 Official site

Defunct magazines published in South Korea
Magazines established in 1993
Magazines disestablished in 2012
Manhwa magazines
Online magazines with defunct print editions